XHTGAN-FM is a community radio station on 107.1 FM in Tangancícuaro, Michoacán, Mexico. It is known as Radio Erandi.

History
Radio Erandi, original callsign XHFC-FM, was permitted on March 14, 2005, but its story predates the original permit. Frente Cívico Tangancícuaro, Pueblo Unido, A.C., the original permitholder, was created in 2001 in response to abuses of power by the municipal government. In 2006, the station had an all-volunteer crew of announcers and staff.

The original Radio Erandi permit wound up not renewed, and a new community concession was applied for to replace XHFC-FM. In December 2017, XHTGAN-FM 106.1 was approved to replace XHFC. On October 16, 2019, in order to resolve co-channel interference problems with XHCHIL-FM in Chilchota, XHTGAN was ordered to move to 107.1 MHz, carrying out the change on January 1, 2020.

References

Radio stations in Michoacán
Community radio stations in Mexico
Radio stations established in 2005